Maria Christina "Ia" Langhammer (born 13 August 1962 in Stockholm) is a Swedish singer and actor.

Langhammer studied at Swedish National Academy of Mime and Acting until 1989. In 1998 she received a Guldbagge Award for her role as Berit in the film Hela härligheten.

Selected filmography
1993 – Härifrån till Kim
1999 – Hälsoresan – En smal film av stor vikt
1999 – En liten julsaga
2000 – Livet är en schlager
2000 – Låt stå! (TV)
2001 – Jordgubbar med riktig mjölk
2003 – Tur & retur
2006 – Exit
2006 – LasseMajas detektivbyrå (TV series)
2007 – Beck – Det tysta skriket
2008 – Allt flyter
2008 – Häxdansen (TV)
2009 – Flickan
2009 – Wallander – Hämnden
2009 – De halvt dolda (TV)
2012 – Nobel's Last Will
2013 – Crimes of Passion (TV)

References

External links

Swedish actresses
Living people
1962 births
Actresses from Stockholm
Best Supporting Actress Guldbagge Award winners